Ramon Magsaysay (Cubao) High School (RMCHS), also referred to by its colloquial portmanteau Monsay or Monching (as homage to one of Ramon Magsaysay's nicknames), is a public high school in Quezon City, Philippines. It was founded as an annex of Quezon City High School (QCHS) in 1953 then became an independent school in 1958. It is one of the two schools in Metro Manila named after President Ramon Magsaysay (the other being Ramon Magsaysay High School, Manila).

History 
The school was established as an annex of Quezon City High School (QCHS) in 1953. It was located at The school was located at Epifanio de los Santos Avenue (EDSA), near Cubao Elementary School. As a new school, it needed temporary housing for its academe, which happened in 1958 when it was housed in a building at the corner of Aurora Blvd, and Fanny Enriquez was then named as the school's first principal, and was named as this the independent Cubao High School. After one academic year, the school again relocated in 1960 to New Orleans St., behind the old Quezon City Hall. Due to accelerating socio-economic development in Quezon City, Cubao High School annexes began sprouting. The first of these was the Murphy Annex, which started operations in 1961. This annex was named Juan Sumulong High School (JSHS) upon being designated an independent school in 1964. The second annex became Carlos P. Garcia High School (CPGHS) which became independent in 1972, while the third became Ponciano Bernardo High School (PBHS) which became independent in 1968.

On March 17, 1965, Cubao High School was renamed in memory of President Ramon Magsaysay who perished in a plane crash on March 17, 1957, which was attended by Magsaysay's widow, Luz-Banzon Magsaysay. Consequently, this marked March 17 of every as the school's Foundation Day. The school year 1968-1969 saw a record boom in enrollment, resulting in the lack of accommodations for more than 81,000 students. To remedy the situation, the old Quezon City Hall, standing on prime land at the corner of EDSA and Minnesota St. (now Ermin Garcia St.), was appropriated as the permanent school site. The school began offering summer school in 1977. Unfortunately, on March 15, 1981, a devastating fire gutted the entire school building, burning most of the school's records. The school year (SY) for 1981-1982 was spent at the nearby Raval Building, which was rented by the city government to enable students to continue their schooling.

Through the initiative of former First Lady and then Metro Manila Governor Imelda Marcos and then city Mayor Adelina S. Rodriguez, construction of a P13.6 million school building began in 1982. The three-story building was inaugurated on September 8 of the same year. Through the Department of Education, Culture and Sports (DECS) initiative, a two-story Secondary Education Development Program (SEDP) building was constructed. To cope with the demand for more classrooms, the city government vacated the adjacent Post Office to give way to the construction of a new school building sponsored by then-Congressman Sonny Belmonte in 1997. 

In 1998, a fourth building was constructed beside the SEDP building to house the laboratory classes of the students. It was called the DOST Building, named after the Department of Science and Technology, which sponsored the building of the facility. Three more buildings were added to the school's compound to house the technical and home economics subjects, as well as the science curriculum students of the school, namely the Home Economics Building in 1999, the Mathay Building in 2002, and the Technology Building in 2003. 

In 2007, the SEDP building was demolished to make way for the construction of a four-storey building named the New Sonny Belmonte Building. This new building now serves as the house for computer units and laboratory equipment for the Junior High School (JHS) students, with the Mathay Building being the house for the computer units and laboratory equipment of the Senior High School (JHS) students, in response to the country's shift to the K-12 curriculum.

In 2013, the school's Foundation Day was moved to August 31, Magsaysay's birthdate, then it was moved back again in 2015 to March 17, Magsaysay's death. However, in the same year, another tragedy happened to the school when fire devoured the school's canteen in the main building on June 6, 2015. 

From 2020 to 2021, two school markers were constructed in the Main Building and in the Mathay Building to make the school's environment more engaging, along with the introduction of the renaming of the school's chess club into the GM Eugene Torre Chess Center, named after alumnus Eugene Torre. On the school's 65th Foundation Day, a life-sized statue of Ramon Magsaysay was unveiled on the school's grounds which the RMCHSAAI sponsored, the school's incorporated alumni association. This statue project was made to complement the bust of Ramon Magsaysay that is adjacent to the said statue.

Curricula 
Ramon Magsaysay (Cubao) High School, as with other Public Schools in the Philippines, follows the Basic Education Curriculum as prescribed by the Department of Education. In 1994, President Fidel V. Ramos introduced the Engineering and Science Education Program (ESEP) in some selected public schools in the Philippines; and the Ramon Magsaysay (Cubao) High School was one of those who were selected. The ESEP Curriculum revised its predecessor, the Science and Technology Education Program (STEP), which was then formulated by the Department of Education, Culture, and Sports. In 2013, the ESEP Curriculum was then changed to Science, Technology, Engineering, and Mathematics (STEM) Curriculum, in lieu of the Government's Revision of the old Education Curriculum; changing from the Basic Education Curriculum (BEC) to the K-12 Education Curriculum.

There are other Curricula offered by the school such as the following:
 Special Education Curriculum (SPED) - it is one of the public schools in Quezon City to accept special education learning at the secondary level
 Foreign Language Service Curriculum (Chinese-Mandarin) - mandated both by the TLE and the English department
 Alternative Delivery Mode (ADM) - for reaching out to out-of-school youth and for those who want to finish high school
 Special Program for the Arts (SPA) - a special program for talented students in the field of arts

Notable alumni

Sports
The following people below are the list of alumni from the school that became part of the athletic representation of the Philippines, locally and internationally.
Eugenio Torre (HS '68) - chess grandmaster
Ramar Aguirre Acuña (HS '08) - freediving athlete
Claudine Veloso (JHS '17) - kickboxing athlete

Arts, media, and entertainment
The following people below are the list of alumni from the school that became part of the various arts, media, and entertainment hubs in the Philippines.
Reuel Molina Aguila (HS '70) - playwright
Erin Ocampo - actress and entrepreneur
Josiah Antonio (HS '08) - news writer, ABS-CBN News
Larah Grace Lacap (HS '10) - top 15 finalist of Binibining Pilipinas 2017 and entrepreneur
Jan Carlo Anolin (HS '14) - sports writer, Manila Bulletin

Sciences
The following people below are the list of alumni from the school that became part of the scientific community in various fields.
Engr. Izrael Zenar Bautista  - BIRDS-4 project manager for Maya-2

Government
The following people below are the list of alumni from the school that became part of the branches of government of the Philippines.
Normandie Pizarro (HS '65) - associate justice of Court of Appeals of the Philippines
Joseph S. Tan - former mayor of Santiago, Isabela

Military
The following people below are the list of alumni from the school that became part of the Philippine Army.
Angelo Reyes (HS '60) - former AFP Chief-of-Staff and cabinet secretary under President Gloria Macapagal Arroyo

Business
The following people below are the list of alumni from the school that made big names in their respective industries.
Bern E. Almazan (HS '78) - chief financial officer of Abakada Studios
Aldren Samson (HS '05) - president and CEO of Enfinity Imperial Solar Solutions Inc.

References 

1953 establishments in the Philippines
Educational institutions established in 1953
Schools in Quezon City
Public schools in Metro Manila
High schools in Metro Manila
Science high schools in Metro Manila